"Throne Room" is a song by American worship leader, singer, and songwriter Kim Walker-Smith. It was released on March 10, 2017, as the lead single from her third studio album, On My Side (2017). The song was written by Walker-Smith, Jacob Sooter, Lindsay Sweat, and Mia Fieldes. It appeared on the album WOW Hits 2018: Deluxe Edition.

Background
In an interview with Hannah Goodwyn of CBN, Walker-Smith stated:

Critical reception
Timothy Yap of Hallels said the song "is what gives Jesus Culture its patented sound. Bold, anthemic and with their signature epic build-up, 'Throne Room' puts to worship the promise of Hebrews 4:16." Jesus Freak Hideout's Mason Haynie claimed "Walker-Smith takes a well-known idea in 'Throne Room' and makes it all the more reverential by pondering the heaviness of God's name." Kevin Ekmark of Church stated "[Throne Room] is almost haunting with what sounds like angels singing in the background. The strong percussion and build to the chorus help it stand out as the first powerful worship song on the album." Louder Than the Music's Jay Wright proclaimed "we are reminded that in God's holy presence we get captivated 'with angels and saints and all I can say is holy, holy, holy are You God!' With its powerful lyrics, the track has a heavier sound to it, building strongly by the chorus. Kim's vocals match the building music perfectly!"

Music videos
The official music video for the song was released on March 16, 2017 and has garnered over 1.3 million views as of November 2017.

Charts

Release history

References

2017 singles
2017 songs
Songs written by Mia Fieldes